Maredumilli Mandal is one of the 22 mandals in Alluri Sitharama Raju District of Andhra Pradesh. As per census 2011, there are 71 villages in this Mandal.

Demographics 
Maredumilli Mandal has total population of 19,507 as per the Census 2011 out of which 10,166 are males while 9,341 are females. The average Sex Ratio of Maredumilli Mandal is 919. The total literacy rate of Maredumilli Mandal is 59%.

Towns & Villages

Villages 
1. Addarivalasa
2. Akumamidikota
3. Arjunalova
4. Banda
5. Bhimavaram
6. Bodlanka
7. Boduluru
8. Busigandi
9. Chakkavada
10. Chatlavada
11. Chavidikota
12. D Velamalakota
13. Daravada
14. Denduluru
15. Devarapalle
16. Dorachintalapalem
17. Doramamidi
18. Egavalasa
19. Elivada
20. Goguvalasa
21. Gondivada
22. Goramamidi
23. Gudisa
24. Gujjumamidivalasa
25. Gumpenagandi
26. Gundrathi
27. Ijjaluru
28. Ivampalle
29. Kadumuru
30. Kakuru
31. Katchalavada
32. Kondavada
33. Kuduru
34. Kundada
35. Kutravada
36. Maddiveedu
37. Madduluru
38. Mallavaram
39. Maredumilli
40. Muchilivada
41. Munjamamidi
42. Munthamamidi
43. Musuru
44. Narsapuram
45. Nellore
46. Nukaletivada
47. Nurupudi
48. Pamulamamidi
49. Pamuleru
50. Pandirimamidikota
51. Pedamallupadu
52. Peddamarri
53. Pedduru
54. Potlavada
55. Pujaripakalu
56. Pullangi
57. Pusiwada
58. Puttagondilanka
59. Ramannavalasa
60. Siripanlova
861. Sripuram
62. Sunnampadu
63. Thadepalle
64. Thurruru
65. Thurumamidi
66. Vakkuluru
67. Valamuru
68. Vetukuru
69. Vuthaluru
70. Vyadapudi

See also 
List of mandals in Andhra Pradesh

References 

Mandals in Alluri Sitharama Raju district